Rockwood Academy may refer to:

Rockwood Academy, Birmingham, a secondary school in Alum Rock, Birmingham, England
Rockwood Academy (Ontario), a former private school in Rockwood, Ontario, Canada

See also
Rockwood (disambiguation)